Paolo Cesare Maldini  (born 26 June 1968) is an Italian former professional footballer who played primarily as a left back and centre back for AC Milan and the Italy national team. He is widely regarded as one of the greatest defenders of all time. As the Milan and Italy captain for many years he was nicknamed "Il Capitano" ("The Captain"). Maldini held the record for most appearances in Serie A, with 647, until 2020, when he was overtaken by Gianluigi Buffon. He is currently serving as technical director for Milan, as well as being co-owner of USL Championship club Miami FC.

Maldini spent all 25 seasons of his playing career in the Serie A with Milan, before retiring at the age of 41 in 2009. He won 26 trophies with Milan: the European Cup/UEFA Champions League five times, seven Serie A titles, one Coppa Italia, five Supercoppa Italiana titles, five European/UEFA Super Cups, two Intercontinental Cups and one FIFA Club World Cup. Maldini won the Best Defender trophy at the UEFA Club Football Awards at the age of 39, as well as the Serie A Defender of the Year Award in 2004. Following his retirement after the 2008–09 season, Milan retired his number 3 shirt.

Maldini made his debut for Italy in 1988, playing for 14 years before retiring in 2002 with 7 goals and 126 caps, an appearance record at the time, which has since been surpassed by Fabio Cannavaro and Gianluigi Buffon. Maldini captained Italy for eight years and held the record for appearances as Italy's captain (75), until he was again overtaken by Cannavaro and Buffon. With Italy, Maldini took part in four FIFA World Cups and three UEFA European Championships. Although he did not win a tournament with Italy, he reached the final of the 1994 World Cup and Euro 2000, and the semi-final of the 1990 World Cup and Euro 1988. He was elected into the all-star teams for each of these tournaments, in addition to Euro 1996.

Maldini came second to George Weah for FIFA World Player of the Year in 1995. He also placed third in the Ballon d'Or in 1994 and 2003. In 2002, he was chosen as a defender on the FIFA World Cup Dream Team, and in 2004 Pelé named him in the FIFA 100 list of the world's greatest living players. He was also selected for the Ballon d'Or Dream Team in 2020. Maldini held the record for most appearances in UEFA Club competitions, with 174, until he was overtaken by Iker Casillas in 2017. He is the record appearance holder for Milan with 902 appearances in all competitions, and is one of the few players to have made over 1,000 career appearances. In December 2012, he was inducted into the Italian Football Hall of Fame.

Club career

1984–1987: Youth career, AC Milan senior debut and early professional career
Originally a AC Milan youth squad product, Maldini also went on to play his entire club career with the senior side. He won the Coppa Italia Primavera with the Milan Youth side during the 1984–85 season, and he made his league debut for Milan under manager Nils Liedholm during the same season on 20 January 1985, replacing the injured Sergio Battistini in a match against Udinese at age 16. It was his only league appearance of the campaign, but he was immediately made a member of the starting eleven the following season, at age 17, at right-back, being handed the number 3 shirt, which had previously also belonged to his father, Cesare. Maldini also made his Coppa Italia debut in 1985, on 21 August, while his debut in European competition also came later that same year, on 18 September. He scored the first of his 29 goals in Serie A on 4 January 1987 in a 1–0 win against Como.

1987–1991: Domestic and international success with The immortals
The 1987–88 Scudetto under Arrigo Sacchi marked Maldini's first trophy, and the first of seven league titles, with the club. Nicknamed "The Immortals", Sacchi's Milan side is remembered for including the Dutch trio of Frank Rijkaard, Ruud Gullit and Marco van Basten, as well as the Italian midfielders Carlo Ancelotti, Roberto Donadoni (and later Demetrio Albertini), and a strong defensive lineup. Under Sacchi and later Fabio Capello, Maldini formed with long-timers Franco Baresi, Alessandro Costacurta, Mauro Tassotti, as well as Filippo Galli, Stefano Nava and later Christian Panucci, one of football's strongest defensive quartets of all time. During the 1987–88 Serie A season, Milan only conceded 14 goals, finishing with the best defence in Italy, as they went on to win the Serie A title. Maldini went on to win the 1988 Supercoppa Italiana with Milan the following season, and followed up this trophy with back to back European Cup titles in 1988–89 and 1989–90, while Milan finished in third and in second place in Serie A during those respective seasons. On 19 February 1989, Maldini made his 100th appearance in Serie A.

Milan reached the final of the 1989–90 Coppa Italia, losing out to Juventus. Milan also managed to capture successive European Super Cup titles in 1989 and 1990, as well as successive Intercontinental Cup titles, once again 1989 and 1990. The following season, in Sacchi's final season with the club, Milan were eliminated in the quarter-finals of the European Cup by eventual finalists Marseille, and finished second in Serie A, behind Sampdoria, once again with the best defence in the league, conceding only 19 goals. Milan reached the semi-finals of the Coppa Italia, losing out to eventual champions Roma. In 1989, Maldini was awarded the Bravo Award, as the best under-23 player in European Competitions.

1991–1996: Continued success with The invincibles
Under Sacchi's replacement, Fabio Capello, Milan continued to be a dominant force in Italy and in Europe. Maldini was also part of Milan's undefeated Serie A team, which won the championship in the 1991–92 season; in total, Milan went unbeaten for an Italian record of 58 league matches, earning the nickname "The Invincibles". This championship was Milan's first of three consecutive Serie A titles under Capello in the early 1990s. Maldini helped Milan defend the Serie A title the following season, and reach the first of three consecutive UEFA Champions League finals. Milan lost the 1993 Champions League final in a 1–0 defeat to Marseille. That season, Maldini scored his first goal in European Competitions on 21 October 1992 in a 1–0 Champions League win against Slovan Bratislava, and also made his 200th appearance in Serie A on 4 October of the same year. The following season, Milan captured their third consecutive Serie A title, finishing with the best defence in Italy, conceding just 15 goals. Maldini also helped lead Milan to a second consecutive Champions League final, where he helped his team defeat Barcelona. Due to Alessandro Costacurta's suspension and injuries sustained to Franco Baresi, Jean-Pierre Papin and Marco van Basten, Barcelona's "Dream Team", coached by Johan Cruyff, were heavy favourites to win the trophy, with the formidable attacking duo of Romário and Hristo Stoichkov. Despite their key absences, Maldini helped the Milan defence keep a clean sheet and overcome Barcelona 4–0 in the final, with two goals from Daniele Massaro and one each from Dejan Savićević and Marcel Desailly.

After winning his third Champions League title and reaching the 1994 World Cup final, Maldini became the first defender ever to win World Soccer magazine's annual World Player of the Year Award. During his acceptance speech, Maldini called his milestone "a particular matter of pride because defenders generally receive so much less attention from fans and the media than goalscorers. We are more in the engine room rather than taking the glory". He then singled out Milan captain Franco Baresi as a player who "really [deserved] to receive the sort of award I have received". Maldini also placed third in the 1994 Ballon d'Or, behind Stoichkov and compatriot Roberto Baggio, and fifth in the FIFA World Player of the Year Award.

The following season, Milan and Maldini captured their third consecutive Supercoppa Italiana under Capello, and won the European Super Cup, missing out on the Intercontinental Cup. After three consecutive titles, Milan were unable to retain their Serie A title, although they reached their third consecutive Champions League final, where they were defeated 1–0 by Ajax. Maldini came second behind future teammate George Weah in the 1995 FIFA World Player of the Year Award for his performances. On 17 February 1995, he made his 300th appearance in Serie A. Maldini was able to capture his fifth Serie A title, and his fourth under Capello, the following season.

1996–2001: Assuming the captaincy, struggles, and 1999 Serie A title
Following Capello's departure, and the aging and retirement of several key players, Milan suffered disappointing results during the next few seasons, undergoing several managerial changes. Milan lost the Supercoppa Italiana to Fiorentina in 1996, and failed to qualify for European competitions for two consecutive seasons, as well as suffering a group stage elimination in the 1996–97 Champions League. Following Franco Baresi's and Mauro Tassotti's retirement after the 1996–97 season, Maldini was appointed Milan's captain. Despite the difficulties Milan encountered during this period, through Maldini's leadership, they reached the Coppa Italia final in 1998, losing to Lazio, and won the 1998–99 Serie A title under Alberto Zaccheroni, finishing one point ahead of Lazio. He made his 400th Serie A appearance on 25 April 1999. In the 1999–2000 season, Milan lost the Supercoppa Italiana against Parma, finished third in Serie A and finished bottom of their Champions League group. Milan were eliminated in the second round of the Champions League the next season and finished in sixth place in Serie A, failing to qualify for the Champions League, and participated in the UEFA Cup the following season.

2001–2007: New era of success

Milan again became a dominant force in Italy and in Europe under Carlo Ancelotti. In the 2001–02 season, Milan finished in fourth place, qualifying for the Champions League, and also reached their best ever finish in the UEFA Cup, losing in the semi-finals. In 2002, Maldini was awarded the Premio Nazionale Carriera Esemplare "Gaetano Scirea", for his career achievements and personality. The following season, Maldini lined up with Alessandro Nesta, Alessandro Costacurta and Cafu, who, along with Jaap Stam during the 2004–05 season, formed a formidable defensive lineup in Italy and in Europe. Milan finished third in Serie A, but Maldini won the first Coppa Italia of his career, defeating Roma in the final. On 15 March 2003, he made his 500th appearance in Serie A.

Milan won the 2002–03 Champions League with Maldini as their captain for the first time in his career, in the first all-Italian final, against Juventus, on 28 May 2003 at Old Trafford. Maldini helped Milan keep a clean sheet, as they defeated Juventus 3–2 on penalties after a 0–0 deadlock following extra time. On that day, it was exactly 40 years since his father, Cesare, had also lifted the European Cup trophy as Milan's captain, also in England. He and his father are only one of three other father-son pairs to have also done so; the others being Manuel and Manolo Sanchís of Real Madrid, and Carles and Sergio Busquets of Barcelona. Maldini was elected Man of the Match and was named in the UEFA Team of the Year for the first time in his career.

The following season, Milan were defeated by Juventus on penalties in the Supercoppa Italiana, and in the Intercontinental Cup final by Boca Juniors, once again on penalties, but managed to defeat Porto to capture yet another UEFA Super Cup. Maldini placed third in the 2003 Ballon d'Or for the second time in his career. Maldini went on to captain Milan to win the Serie A title that season, with a record 82 points, whilst Milan were eliminated in the semi-finals of the Coppa Italia by Lazio, and in the quarter-finals of the Champions League by Deportivo de La Coruña. In April 2004, Maldini placed tenth on the UEFA Golden Jubilee Poll, an online UEFA survey, which was organised to commemorate the best European footballers of the past 50 years. Maldini was the second-highest placed Italian after Dino Zoff. Maldini was also included in the FIFA 100 list in 2004, which was a selection of the 125 greatest living footballers, chosen by Pelé. Following his Series A-winning performances, Maldini was elected to be the Serie A Defender of the Year in 2004 at the Italian footballing Awards.

Maldini began the next season by lifting the 2004 Supercoppa Italiana as captain after Milan defeated Lazio. Milan finished second in Serie A to Juventus that season, and reached the Champions League final, only to lose out on penalties to Liverpool, although Maldini opened the scoring in the first minute. In 2005, Maldini was elected to be a part of the UEFA Team of the Year for the second time in his career, and was also elected to be the part of the FIFPro World XI for the first time in his career. The following season, Milan finished second behind Juventus in Serie A once again, and reached the Champions League semi-finals, only to be defeated by eventual champions Barcelona. Both Juventus and Milan were later deducted points for being involved in the 2006 "Calciopoli" matchfixing scandal, and the title was awarded to Internazionale, while Juventus were relegated, with Milan finishing in third place after the point deduction. During the season, Maldini scored his first and only double of his career, against Reggina. On 25 September 2005, Maldini broke Dino Zoff's Serie A appearance record after playing his 571st league match against Treviso; seven days earlier, he had played his 800th game in all competitions for Milan.

The following season, Maldini helped to captain Milan to a fourth-place finish, despite their point deduction, leading them to obtain a crucial Champions League qualifying spot. Maldini played his 600th Serie A match on 13 May 2007 in a 1–1 draw at Catania. That season, Maldini captained Milan to their third Champions League final in six years, leading them to a 2–1 victory over Liverpool in the final on 23 May 2007 in Athens, avenging their defeat from 2005. At age 38, Maldini became the oldest captain to lift the Champions League trophy. Maldini participated in eight Champions League finals during his career, which is equalled only by Francisco Gento of Real Madrid; Maldini lifted the trophy five times, twice as captain. In an interview with ESPN aired prior to the 2007 final, Maldini labeled the 2005 Champions League final as the worst moment of his career. A match where he scored the fastest-ever goal in a European Cup final after 51 seconds and became the oldest player ever to score in a final, Milan lost on penalties to Liverpool after leading 3–0 at half-time. Maldini was elected the UEFA Club Defender of the Year for his 2007 performances.

In 2007, after Milan won the UEFA Super Cup against Sevilla (although Maldini did not appear in the match), Maldini became the first European captain to lift the FIFA Club World Cup after defeating Boca Juniors on 16 December. He announced his plans to retire at the end of the 2007–08 season, saying that he would do so with "no regrets". Following Milan's elimination from the Champions League by Arsenal in March, however, Maldini stated that he would possibly delay his retirement for at least a further year. He signed an extension on 6 June that kept him at Milan for the 2008–09 season.

2008–2009: Final years and retirement

On 16 February 2008, in the match against Parma at the Stadio Ennio Tardini, Maldini came on for defender Marek Jankulovski to make his 1,000th professional career appearance, of which 861 were with Milan, 12 with the Italy under-21 side, 1 with the Italian Olympic team and 126 with the Italy senior team. In European football, only the English goalkeeper Peter Shilton had collected more appearances at the time: 1,390 between 1966 and 1997. Maldini played his last game in the Champions League on 4 March 2008, a 2–0 loss at the San Siro in the last 16 against Arsenal which eliminated Milan from the 2007–08 Champions League. In 2008, Maldini was awarded the FIFA Order of Merit, as well as the Premio Internazionale Giacinto Facchetti, which is awarded to a player who was demonstrated both skill and fair play throughout his career.

On 18 April 2009, Maldini announced that he would retire at the end of the 2008–09 season. On 17 May 2009, in the Stadio Friuli, Maldini played his 900th official match for Milan in a league game against Udinese. Maldini's last match in San Siro was on 24 May, a 3–2 loss against Roma, and was given a standing ovation by the fans. There was a small controversy, however, when the Milan Ultras fans known as Brigate Rossonere protested against Maldini as he said goodbye. His last appearance for Milan, and his last game as an active player, was a 2–0 win against Fiorentina on 31 May 2009 in the last match of the Serie A season. This win meant Milan finished in third place and qualified for the following season's Champions League. Maldini was once again given a standing ovation by the fans. As they had previously done with Franco Baresi's number 6 shirt, Milan retired Maldini's number 3 shirt, but stated that it will be bequeathed to one of his sons if one of them were to make the club's senior team.

On 28 August 2009 in Monte Carlo, Paolo Maldini was Awarded a prize for his career by UEFA during the draw for the group stage of the 2009–10 Champions League. On 17 November 2009, Spanish sports newspaper Marca awarded Maldini the "Marca Leyenda" prize for his career and achievements.

International career

Early career and 1990 World Cup

In 1986, Maldini was called up by his father Cesare Maldini to the Italian under-21 national team, and made his debut for the team on the 12 November of that year, in a 0–0 draw against Austria; he earned 12 caps and scored five goals in two years with the azzurrini, with his first goal coming on 11 February 1987, in a 2–1 win against Portugal. Maldini was also member of the under-21 team that finished runners-up to Spain in the 1986 UEFA European Under-21 Championship. Two years later, he also featured for the under-21 team that was eliminated in the first round against eventual winners France in the 1988 UEFA European Under-21 Championship.

Maldini made his senior debut for the Italy senior team at age 19 on 31 March 1988 in a 1–1 friendly draw against Yugoslavia in Split, and made one appearance for the Italy Olympic squad on 28 October 1987, although he was not part of the team that finished in fourth place at the 1988 Olympics. Maldini featured in all four of Italy's games at UEFA Euro 1988, where they reached the semi-finals, losing to the Soviet Union.

Maldini participated in his first World Cup in 1990 on home soil, appearing in all seven Italy matches. He helped Italy to win five consecutive games and was a starting member of the defence that kept a FIFA World Cup record of five consecutive clean sheets. The Italian defence eventually conceded an equalising goal in the semi-final match against Carlos Bilardo's Argentina, after going a World Cup record total of 518 minutes without conceding. Following two periods of extra time, in which neither team was able to score, Italy lost out to Argentina on penalties. Italy eventually placed third after defeating England 2–1 in the third-place final match, and finishing the tournament with the best defence having conceded two goals throughout the entire World Cup. Maldini was elected to be part of the Team of the Tournament.

1994 World Cup Final and appointment to captaincy

Maldini's first international goal came in his 44th career match, in a 2–0 friendly win over Mexico in Florence on 20 January 1993. Maldini was part of the Italy squad that participated in the 1992 U.S. Cup, finishing in second place in the friendly tournament, behind the host nation. Italy failed to qualify for Euro 1992, finishing second in their group, but qualified for the 1994 World Cup, where Maldini was named vice-captain for Italy. During the 1994 World Cup, Maldini played in all seven of Italy's matches, and deputised for the injured Franco Baresi in the matches against Mexico, Nigeria, Spain and Bulgaria, keeping a clean sheet in the group match against Norway. Maldini led the Italian defence to the final, playing both as a centre-back and as a full-back, due to the absences of his Milan and Italy defensive teammates Baresi, due to injury, Mauro Tassotti, due to suspension after the quarter-finals, and Alessandro Costacurta, who was suspended for the final. Maldini helped Italy keep a clean sheet in the final against favourites Brazil as the team eventually lost on penalties. As in 1990, Maldini was named in the Team of the Tournament, 32 years after his father Cesare received the same honour at the 1962 World Cup.

After Franco Baresi's international retirement in 1994, Maldini was appointed the team's full-time captain. A disappointing Euro 1996 campaign saw Italy eliminated in the group stage with four points, in a group which contained the two eventual finalists of the tournament, Germany and the Czech Republic. Maldini played in all three of Italy's group matches. The 1998 World Cup in France saw Italy start strongly, topping their group. Maldini played in all five of Italy's matches, and started the play that led to Christian Vieri's opening goal in Italy's first match against Chile, which ended in a 2–2 draw. Maldini, partnering with Alessandro Costacurta, Fabio Cannavaro, Alessandro Nesta and Giuseppe Bergomi, also helped Italy to keep clean sheets in the second group match against Cameroon, the round of 16 match Norway and France in the quarter-finals, but Italy eventually went out of the tournament to the hosts and eventual champions on penalties, for the third consecutive time in a World Cup.

Euro 2000 Final and fourth World Cup
Maldini made his 100th appearance for Italy on 28 April 1999, in a 0–0 friendly away draw against Croatia, under manager Dino Zoff. The following year, Italy reached the final of Euro 2000, but lost once again to defending World Cup champions France in extra time. Maldini played in all six of Italy's matches during the tournament. Italy topped their group, winning every match, and Maldini, starting alongside Fabio Cannavaro and Alessandro Nesta, helped the Italian defence to concede only two goals en route to the final, keeping clean sheets against co-hosts Belgium in the group stage, Romania in the quarter-finals and co-hosts the Netherlands in the semi-finals. A ten-man Italy advanced to the final on penalties after a 0–0 draw with the Dutch following extra time. Although Maldini missed his penalty, Italy won the shootout 3–1. Italy were leading 1–0 in the final until Wiltord equalised in the final minute of stoppage time. David Trezeguet scored the golden goal in the 103rd minute, in extra time. In all of the three UEFA European Championships in which Maldini participated, he was elected to be part of the team of the tournament for his performances.

On 7 October 2000, in a 3–0 win over Romania in Milan in a 2002 World Cup qualifier, Maldini overtook Dino Zoff to become Italy's most capped player of all time with his 113th senior international appearance for Italy. Maldini played in his fourth World Cup, and his second as captain, in the 2002 World Cup in Korea and Japan. He helped Italy keep a clean sheet in their opening win against Ecuador, and played in all four of Italy's matches. Italy disappointed in the remaining group matches, but went on to the knockout round as the second placed team of their group. Immediately after a ten-man Italy were controversially eliminated in the round of sixteen, by a golden goal, to co-hosts South Korea, Maldini retired from international football, at the age of 34, as Italy's most capped player. He scored seven international goals, all coming in home games. He spent over half of his 16 years as an international as team captain, wearing the armband a record 74 times, until he was overtaken by Cannavaro, and subsequently Buffon. Despite his performances for his country, Maldini was unable to win a trophy, although he reached the final of both the World Cup and the European Championship. Maldini made 23 appearances in World Cups, the third-highest total after Lothar Matthäus, who appeared in 25 matches and Lionel Messi, who appeared in 26 matches.

In February 2009, Italian head coach Marcello Lippi declared his support for a testimonial match for Maldini, stating that it would give him a chance to play for the Azzurri for a final time. The Italian Football Federation (FIGC) offered him a place in the line-up in a friendly match against Northern Ireland. Maldini, however, rejected the offer, saying that he wanted to part with football in an "official" match.

After retirement

Prior to his retirement, Maldini expressed that he would never be moving into a coaching career. He was offered a position that would have reunited him with his former manager Carlo Ancelotti by joining Chelsea as a coach, having reportedly met with Ancelotti and with Chelsea's owner, Roman Abramovich, to discuss such a possibility. Ancelotti later announced that Maldini had turned down his offer to become part of Chelsea's coaching staff.

In 2012, Maldini was inducted into the Italian Football Hall of Fame. Maldini played in the 11th Match Against Poverty on 4 March 2014, appearing with other star players including Ronaldo, Zinedine Zidane, Luís Figo and Pavel Nedvěd, which was held in Bern, Switzerland, with proceeds raised helping the recovery efforts in the Philippines in the wake of Typhoon Haiyan. On 1 September 2014, Maldini, along with many current and former footballing stars, took part in the "Match for Peace", which was played at the Stadio Olimpico, Rome, with the proceeds being donated to charity. In May 2015, it was announced that Maldini became the co-owner of North American Soccer League (NASL) club Miami FC, alongside television rights entrepreneur Riccardo Silva, in hope that the team would be able to join the Major League Soccer (MLS) in future. On 1 May 2016, Maldini became the second player ever after Southampton's Matthew Le Tissier to receive the One Club Man Award from Basque club Athletic Bilbao; he was presented with the prize at half-time, during the club's 2–1 home win over Celta de Vigo, and received a standing ovation from the attending fans.

In June 2017, Maldini qualified for the Aspria Tennis Cup in Milan, a professional tennis tournament on the ATP Challenger Tour, along with his doubles partner Stefano Landonio, after winning a qualifier in Italy. They were defeated in the first round by Tomasz Bednarek and David Pel by a score of 6–1, 6–1. After the defeat, Maldini conceded that it was likely to be his last professional tennis match.

2018-Present: Back to AC Milan

In August 2018, a few weeks after Milan's change of ownership in favour of Elliott Management Corporation, he accepted an offer to become the sporting strategy & development director for the club, working alongside new sporting director Leonardo. This marked his comeback to the club since his retirement from active football. On 14 June 2019, Maldini was promoted to technical director.

After 3 years as a technical director, Milan won 2021-22 Serie A title, the first one in 11 years, with Maldini himself being instrumental in bringing many talents, the likes of Theo Hernandez, Rafael Leao, Oliver Giroud, Tomori, and Mike Maignan, the latter being named best goalkeeper of the aforementioned season, Leao also was awarded the MVP of the season.

On 1 July 2022, one day after his contract expired with club, it was announced that he renewed his contract with club for additional two years as technical director. On 17 November 2022, he was recognised as Sporting Director of the Year alongside fellow Milan director Frederic Massara at the 2022 Globe Soccer Awards.

Player profile

Style of play

Although he played as a left back for most of his career, Maldini was naturally right footed, and began playing for Milan as a right back. He was switched to the left back position by manager Arrigo Sacchi due to the presence of Mauro Tassotti on the right for Milan. This was made possible due to Maldini's tactical versatility and ability with both feet, which allowed him to play anywhere along the backline, and have a long and successful professional career, both with Milan and Italy.

Maldini was renowned for his technical ability, athleticism, sliding tackles, stamina, composure and fast energetic forward runs as a left-back or wing-back. He was also an excellent crosser of the ball, and was an effective attacking threat, scoring and assisting several goals throughout his career. In the final few years of his career, as he lost speed, he was moved to a centre-back position, where he excelled in relying on his experience, tactical ability, positioning and timing to win the ball.

As a centre-back, Maldini was renowned for his marking, awareness and ability to anticipate a threat from the opposition. Despite being a precise tackler and an imposing defensive presence, he often avoided committing to challenges when he deemed them unnecessary, preferring to restrict the offensive play of his opponents through his positioning and marking. Maldini was also known for his aerial ability, strength, tackling and man-marking, as well as his tactical knowledge. His passing range and ability to begin plays from the backline also allowed him to advance into the midfield and excel in the sweeper or libero position, on the rare occasion that he was deployed in this role.

Legacy

Maldini is considered to have been one of the greatest defenders of all time, and has been described as "an icon and gentleman of the game". He was known for his calm and composed manner on the pitch, as well as his ability to read the game, preferring elegance and intelligence to physicality and aggression when defending; regarded as a correct player, known for his discipline on the pitch, he only received three red cards throughout his entire career. In a 2002 FIFA poll, Maldini was selected as a defender in the FIFA World Cup Dream Team.

Maldini was the first defender ever shortlisted for the FIFA World Player of the Year award, finishing second in 1995. He was also twice elected as a finalist for the Ballon d'Or, in 1994 and in 2003, where he finished third on both occasions. In addition to his team success, he also won several individual accolades and awards. He won the UEFA Defender of the year, the Serie A defender of the year, the Bravo Award and the World Soccer Player of the Year Award. He has also been elected as part of the UEFA Team of the Year, the FIFPro World XI, the World Cup Team of the Tournament and the European Championship Team of the Tournament during his career. Maldini was a symbol of his club and the Italy national football team. He was renowned for his consistency, versatility, work-rate, and longevity, breaking into the Milan starting lineup as a teenager and remaining there throughout his career until he retired at the age of 41.

Throughout his career, Maldini was also considered to be a leader, both for Milan and for the Italy national team, earning the nickname "Il Capitano" ("The Captain"). He was renowned for his vocal, commanding presence on the pitch, and for his awareness, communication and organisational skills, helping to motivate his teammates and ensuring they remained in position. He played in over 1,000 professional matches during his 25 seasons at Milan, and was the record appearance holder in Serie A until he was overtaken by Gianluigi Buffon in 2020, and still is for Milan in all competitions. Maldini also appeared in a record eight UEFA Champions League Finals, and is the record appearance holder in all UEFA club competitions. With 126 caps during the 16 years he played for Italy, he was the record appearance holder for the national team, until he was overtaken by Fabio Cannavaro in 2009 and by Gianluigi Buffon in 2013. He also formerly held the record number of caps for Italy as captain, wearing the armband on 74 occasions, until being overtaken by Cannavaro. Maldini has inspired many defenders like Rio Ferdinand, Rafael Márquez and Carles Puyol.

Media
Maldini has appeared in commercials for the American sportswear company Nike. He wore Nike Tiempo football boots at the 1994 FIFA World Cup. In 1996, he starred in a Nike commercial titled "Good vs Evil" in a gladiatorial game set in a Roman amphitheatre. Appearing alongside football players from around the world, including Ronaldo, Eric Cantona, Luís Figo, Patrick Kluivert and Jorge Campos, they defend "the beautiful game" against a team of demonic warriors, with Maldini stating, "Maybe they're friendly?" before he starts the move which culminates with Cantona striking the ball and "destroying evil".

Maldini features in EA Sports' FIFA video game series; he was on the cover for the Italian edition of FIFA: Road to World Cup 98, and was named in the Ultimate Team Legends in FIFA 14.

Personal life
Maldini was born on 26 June 1968 in Milan to Cesare Maldini and Maria Luisa De Mezzi. He has been married to Venezuelan former model  since December 1994. The couple have two sons, Christian (born 14 June 1996) and Daniel (born 11 October 2001), who both have been signed by Maldini's former club Milan and played in the youth teams. His father Cesare was also a footballer who also played as a defender, captained Milan, and represented the Italy national team, later going on to become a coach. Throughout Cesare's managerial career, he coached his son both in the Italy under-21 side and the senior team, as well as at Milan, also managing several other teams. On 3 April 2016, Paolo's father Cesare died at the age of 84; his mother died later that year, on 28 July.

Maldini has his own fashion label – Sweet Years – which he runs with friend and former Italy and Milan teammate Christian Vieri.

Career statistics

Club

European competitions include the European Cup/UEFA Champions League and UEFA Cup
Other tournaments include the Supercoppa Italiana, European/UEFA Super Cup, Intercontinental Cup and FIFA Club World Cup
Play-off for UEFA Cup admission
Played in the Torneo Estivo del 1986

International

Scores and results list Italy's goal tally first, score column indicates score after each Maldini goal.

Honours
AC Milan
Serie A: 1987–88, 1991–92, 1992–93, 1993–94, 1995–96, 1998–99, 2003–04
Coppa Italia: 2002–03
Supercoppa Italiana: 1992, 1993, 2004
European Cup/UEFA Champions League: 1988–89, 1989–90, 1993–94, 2002–03, 2006–07
European/UEFA Super Cup: 1989, 1990, 1994, 2003
Intercontinental Cup: 1989, 1990
FIFA Club World Cup: 2007

Italy
FIFA World Cup runner-up: 1994; third place 1990
UEFA European Championship runner-up: 2000
UEFA European Under-21 Championship runner-up: 1986

Individual
UEFA European Championship Team of the Tournament: 1988, 1996, 2000
Bravo Award: 1989
FIFA World Cup All-Star Team: 1990, 1994
Ballon d'Or: Third place 1994, 2003
World Soccer Player of the Year: 1994
El País European Player of the Year: 1994
UNICEF European Footballer of the Season: 1993–94
ESM Team of the Year: 1994–95, 1995–96, 1999–00, 2002–03
FIFA World Player of the Year: Silver Award 1995
Premio Nazionale Carriera Esemplare "Gaetano Scirea": 2002
FIFA World Cup Dream Team: 2002
FIFA XI: 2002
UEFA Champions League Final Man of the Match: 2003
UEFA Team of the Year: 2003, 2005
UEFA President's Award: 2003
Serie A Defender of the Year: 2004
FIFA 100
UEFA Golden Jubilee Poll: #10
FIFA FIFPro World XI: 2005
UEFA Club Defender of the Year: 2007
Premio internazionale Giacinto Facchetti: 2008
FIFA Order of Merit: 2008
UEFA Champions League Achievement Award: 2009
Marca Leyenda: 2009
Sports Illustrated Team of the Decade: 2009
ESPN World Team of the Decade: 2009
Inducted into the Italian Football Hall of Fame: 2012
World Soccer Greatest XI of all time: 2013
One Club Man Award: 2016
UEFA Euro All-time XI
AC Milan Hall of Fame
Inducted into the Walk of Fame of Italian sport: 2018
Gazzetta Sports Awards – Legend: 2018
Ballon d'Or Dream Team: 2020
IFFHS All-time Men's Dream Team: 2021
Globe Soccer Awards Sporting Director of the Year: 2022

Records
 Most appearances in all competitions (Milan): 902
 Second-most Serie A appearances (only Serie A regular-seasons): 647
 Most league appearances for Milan (only Serie A regular-seasons): 647
 Most league appearances for the same club (Milan) (only Serie A regular-seasons): 647
 Most seasons played in Serie A: 25 (shared with Francesco Totti)
 Most seasons played in Serie A for the same club (Milan): 25 (shared with Francesco Totti for Roma)
 Third-most UEFA club competitions appearances: 174
 Most UEFA club competitions appearances for Milan: 174
 Most UEFA club competitions appearances for the same club (Milan): 174
 Most European competitions appearances: 168
 Most European competitions appearances for AC Milan: 168
 Most UEFA Champions League appearances for AC Milan: 139
 Most finals played in UEFA Champions League – 8 (shared with Francisco Gento)
Youngest first-team player (Milan): 16 years and 208 days (against Udinese, 20 January 1985)
Longest-serving player (Milan): 24 years and 132 days (from 20 January 1985 to 31 May 2009)
 Most FIFA World Cup appearances for Italy: 23
 Record of minutes played in the World Cups: 2216
 Fastest goal scored in UEFA Champions League/European Cup final history: 50 seconds, 2005
 Oldest player to score a goal in UEFA Champions League/European Cup final history: aged 36 years and 333 days, playing for Milan against Liverpool, 2005
 Most European/UEFA Super Cup titles: (shared with Dani Alves) (1989, 1990, 1994, 2003)
 Most European/UEFA Super Cup final appearances: (shared with Dani Alves) (1989, 1990, 1993, 1994, 2003)
 Second-most career club appearances by an Italian player: 902
 Most appearances for a single Italian club: 902 (with Milan)

Orders
 4th Class / Officer: Ufficiale Ordine al Merito della Repubblica Italiana: 2000
 5th Class / Knight: Cavaliere Ordine al Merito della Repubblica Italiana: 1991

Notes

See also 
 List of footballers with 100 or more UEFA Champions League appearances
 List of men's footballers with 100 or more international caps
 List of men's footballers with the most official appearances
 List of one-club men in association football

References

External links

Profile at AIC 
Profile at LegaSerieA.it 
Hall of Fame Profile at acmilan.com 
Profile at FIGC 
Profile at Italia1910.com 

1968 births
Living people
Italian people of Slovene descent
Footballers from Milan
Italian footballers
Association football defenders
A.C. Milan players
Serie A players
UEFA Champions League winning players
Italy under-21 international footballers
Italy international footballers
UEFA Euro 1988 players
1990 FIFA World Cup players
1994 FIFA World Cup players
UEFA Euro 1996 players
1998 FIFA World Cup players
UEFA Euro 2000 players
2002 FIFA World Cup players
FIFA 100
FIFA Century Club
World Soccer Magazine World Player of the Year winners
Miami FC
North American Soccer League executives
Italian male tennis players
Knights of the Order of Merit of the Italian Republic
Officers of the Order of Merit of the Italian Republic
Paolo